Francesco Scipione Maria Borghese (20 May 1697, in Rome – 21 June 1759, in Rome) was an Italian cardinal from the Borghese family.  He was elevated to cardinal by Pope Benedict XIII in the consistory of 6 July 1729.

He died in Rome on 21 June 1759 and was buried in the Patriarchal Liberian Basilica.

References

Sources 
 Francesco Scipione Maria Borghese at www.catholic-hierarchy.org 
This page is a translation of its Italian counterpart.

1697 births
1759 deaths
Francesco
18th-century Italian cardinals
Cardinal-bishops of Albano
Clergy from Rome